Boneh-ye Amir Asgar (also Romanized as Boneh-ye Āmīr ‘Asgar; also known as Boneh-ye ‘Asgar) is a village in Howmeh-ye Sharqi Rural District, in the Central District of Ramhormoz County, Khuzestan Province, Iran. At the 2006 census, its population was 170, in 34 families.

References 

Populated places in Ramhormoz County